Vincent Cornell is an American scholar of Islam. From 2000 to 2006 he was a professor of history and director of the King Fahd Center for Middle East and Islamic Studies at the University of Arkansas. He was an advisor to the award-winning, PBS-broadcast documentary Muhammad: Legacy of a Prophet (2002), produced by Unity Productions Foundation. He left Arkansas in 2006 to become a professor of history at Emory University, in Atlanta. Sufism and Islamic philosophy are among his specialities. His books are available in over 2,200 libraries.

As a Muslim and self-described "critical traditionalist", Cornell has publicly deplored what he calls the superficiality of modern-day Islamic practices, which he sees as removed from the religion's traditions of deliberation.  In his view, context should be taken into account in interpreting the sacred texts of Islam, and that in the globalized world of shifting ideas, Muslims cannot isolate themselves from reflexivity.  He is critical of the spread of Wahhabism in the last several decades—a phenomenon he attributes to a "corporate" form of organized Islam fueled by petro dollars.  Nevertheless, he cautions against a simplistic view that "demonizes" the role played by the Saudi monarchy, which he sees as compelled to promote Wahhabism.

References

External links
 Interview by public radio program Speaking of Faith

Living people
21st-century Muslim scholars of Islam
University of Arkansas faculty
Year of birth missing (living people)
Emory University faculty
Muslim scholars of Islamic studies